"Automatic" is a song recorded by Japanese–American singer Hikaru Utada, taken as the lead single from her debut album First Love (1999). It was released on December 9, 1998, through Toshiba-EMI in three physical formats: mini CD single, standard-size CD single and 12" vinyl. Additionally, the single included the A-side "Time Will Tell", which originally served as the B-side for these versions. The song was written and co-produced by Utada, while Akira Miyake and the singer's father Teruzane Utada served as producers. Despite working recording in English under the name Cubic U, "Automatic" is Utada's first Japanese recording, and was released after she enrolled into high school in Japan.

Musically, "Automatic" is an R&B song that incorporates elements of pop, dance and soul music. Lyrically, it delves into themes of love, and focuses on a previous relationship by the singer. Although an English version was recorded, executives at Toshiba-EMI insisted to promote herself in the Japanese market, so she wrote it the region's respective language. Upon its release, "Automatic" received positive reviews from music critics, who commended Utada's vocal abilities and production style. It won numerous accolades in Japan, and has subsequently been listed as one of her best releases.

Commercially, "Automatic" and "Time Will Tell" experienced success in Japan. The 8 cm CD single edition reached number four on the Oricon Singles Chart and sold over 772,000 units there. Meanwhile, the 12 cm CD single edition peaked at number two and sold 1.291 million units, tallying over two million copies in Japan; it was certified Million by the Recording Industry Association of Japan (RIAJ) for physical shipments. Since its release, Oricon has ranked it amongst many best-selling singles in the country, and has earned other distinctions for its commercial success.

An accompanying music video was directed and produced by Tomu Izawa, where it feature the singer in two rooms; a small with a yellow sofa, and a blue room that is lit by LED lights. In order to promote the single, Utada had included it on all her concert tours, such as her Bohemian Summer 2000, Budokan 2004 concert shows, Utada United, In the Flesh, and Wild Life. Additionally, the recording appeared on compilation albums conducted by the artist, and has made appearances on various commercials in Japan.

Background and production
Born and raised in New York City, Utada had her first solo experience in professional recording with Cubic C, a pseudonym used for her earlier English language work. After completing her first record Precious (1998), with the help and guidance of her parents, musicians Teruzane Utada and Keiko Fuji, it failed to generate interest in both the United States and Japan, with the record only appearing at number 38 on the Oricon Albums Chart in the latter country. At the time however, Utada had moved to Tokyo and attended Seisen International School, and later the American School in Japan, subsequently scoring a record contract with label Toshiba-EMI. Executives at the company worked with them to become classified as a singer-songwriter instead of an idol singer, but prompted them to write and record songs in Japanese rather than English.

From the bunch, Utada solely wrote "Automatic" in Tokyo, and recorded a demo tape in mid-1998—which then appeared on the special 15th Anniversary edition of her album First Love (1999). She received help from her father, his friend Akira Miyake, and they both served as producers on the track. Additionally, the singer acts as a co-producer and co-composer on the recording, two roles which she felt were necessary in becoming a singer-songwriter. The trio begun working on her debut single, and recorded it at three studios: Studio Z'd, Wonder Station Yoyogi Studio, and Studio Terra, all based in Tokyo, Japan. According to Utada, an English version exists, but remains unreleased.

Composition and release
Musically, "Automatic" is an R&B song that incorporates elements of pop, dance and soul music. A contributor of Japanese magazine CD Journal noticed that the R&B composition was a very "common" trait in Western culture in the late 1990s. Kano, writing for Rockin'On Japan, agreed, and felt the song infused contemporary soul and club music. The writer commented that her experimentation with R&B music was significant to Japanese culture, as he felt the country did not emphasize the genre. Additionally, he noticed the contrast of her "painful" yet "innocent" vocal range in the number. In a similar review, Mori Tomoyuki from Amazon.com believed that the singers use of R&B "influence the country" and other growing musicians. In 2009, for the singers second English-language album This Is the One, there is a song titled "Automatic Part. 2", which samples parts of the English mentions from the Japanese release.

"Automatic" was released as a double A-side with "Time Will Tell", which premiered on December 9, 1998, through Toshiba-EMI in three physical formats: mini CD single, standard-size CD single and 12" vinyl. All three packages feature the two songs, but included a different third track; the mini CD featured an original karaoke of "Automatic", while the vinyl and standard CD single included an English-dub mix of "Time Will Tell". The cover art for the mini CD was a shot from the accompanying music video, which has the singer sitting on the yellow sofa. In the United States, "Automatic" and "Time Will Tell" were added onto a special 12" vinyl that was published for promotional usage, namely through underground clubs. Furthermore, the artwork used for the standard CD single was yet another shot from the clip, this time with Utada standing in the blue room wearing white clothes.

Critical response
Since its release, "Automatic" has received positive reviews from music critics. A journalist of CD Journal awarded it a special star recognition, praising Utada's "full of emotions" and vocal abilities. Although they did feel that the sound was "generic", the review stated that the production was "flexible" and "pleasant", whilst noting her professional abilities at 15 years old at the time. Kano, writing for Rockin'on Japan magazine, examined the singles ability to re-ignite J-pop globally, and praised her vocal performance in the track. In conclusion, he commented; "Everything started from here." While reviewing her greatest hits album Utada Hikaru Single Collection Vol.1 (2004), Hayashi, reporting for OngakuDB.com, was surprised by "Automatic"'s longevity, stating that it seemed as if it had been released "just yesterday". Satoshi Shimada of Yeah!! J-Pop! and Kanako Hayakawa from Shinko Music agreed, and both felt it was one of the strongest hits from the collection.

Since its release, "Automatic" has been awarded several accolades by music organisations. In 2000, the single was given the gold award for most royalties received from the previous year at the JASRAC awards, beating her own song "Time Will Tell". That same year, it received the Honorable Mention at the Japan Record Awards, and at the Japan Gold Disc Awards, "Automatic" was awarded Song(s) of the Year with her follow-up releases "Movin' on Without You" and "Addicted to You".

Commercial response
Commercially, the mini CD single of "Automatic" / "Time Will Tell" experienced success in Japan. It opened at number four on the Oricon Singles Chart, her first charting experience in that category, and spent a total of 23 weeks. By the end of 1999, Oricon ranked the single at number 22 on her year-end chart, with estimated sales of 772,080, making it the seventh highest entry by a female artist—five of which were claimed by the singer. Meanwhile, the 12 cm CD single of "Automatic" and "Time Will Tell" peaked at number two, two positions higher than the former format. In total, the single spent another 23 weeks, tallying it up to a run of 46 chart appearances. This release claimed an additional 1,290,700 units, making this Utada's best-selling physical single; it was listed at number five on Oricon's year-end chart for the same year.

Because of their individual releases, "Automatic" / "Time Will Tell" has sold 2,062,780 copies together, effectively marking it as the second highest-selling single of 1999, just behind "Dango 3 Kyodai" which was a collaborative release between Kentaro Hayami, Ayumi Shigemori, Sunflower Kids, and the Dumpling choir. Furthermore, it is the second highest-selling single by a female artist, only behind Namie Amuro's hit "Can You Celebrate?" which has amassed 2.750 million copies in the region. In 2014, in celebration of the singers 15th anniversary of First Love, "Automatic" entered the Japan Hot 100 and Adult Contemporary chart at number 73 and 53. It was certified million by the Recording Industry Association of Japan (RIAJ) for physical shipments, and gold for 100,000 ringtone cellphone purchases.

Music video
An accompanying music video was directed and produced by Tomu Izawa, and despite Utada's previous musical work, it is her visual debut. The visual opens with a small intro screen of Utada and the song's title, and disappears to show Utada sitting and singing on a yellow sofa, in front of a closed garage door. As the chorus, she starts to dance with various close-up shots of her face. The second verse and chorus showcases Utada in a small blue room lit by a LED light, and superimposed the song's title on various scenes. It ends with the singer's title against her face, as the screen is tinted blue. The clip was included on her 1999 DVD collection Singles Clip Collection Vol. 1, and subsequently on the 15th anniversary edition of First Love, which included all the visuals from the record. The yellow sofa and garage door scene was parodied in Halcali's single "Tandem", and subsequently through Utada's single "Goodbye Happiness" (Nov 2010), which she directed herself. A music video was also filmed for "Time Will Tell".

Promotion and cover versions
In order to promote the single, Utada conducted several commercial endorsements with companies throughout Japan. It was featured on the Game Boy Color video game, Beatmania GB 2 GatchaMIX for the Game Boy Color. Additionally, "Automatic" has appeared on all concert tours by the singer; its first appearance was her Bohemian Summer Tour in 2000. The following year, Utada hosted an MTV Unplugged series which had them performed the number as one of the closing songs; it was featured on the live album/DVD, and premiered throughout various Japanese music television shows. Three years later, the singer included the track on the set list for her Live in Budokan tour, which was a resident series of concerts at Nippon Budokan, and two years later on Utada United as part of the encore. In 2010, Utada commenced her first international tour in the United Kingdom and United States, titled Utada: In the Flesh 2010. For each date, she performed "Automatic", which was again, another encore number, and also performed it on her December 2010 show Wild Life.

In 1999, Hong Kong singer and actress Kelly Chen covered the song in Mandarin. Ten years later, Jamaican reggae group Sly and Robbie and Unitzz released an English language cover of the song. A second reggae cover was produced in 2011 by DJ Sasa with Island Souls on their album Respect! J-Pop, featuring vocals by Shinobu Nakasone of OrangeClover. Kyoto rock band Unchain released a cover of the song on their cover album Love & Groove Delivery (2013). Swedish band Dirty Loops covered the song on their 2014 album Loopified, and in the same year singer-songwriter Yasuyuki Okamura recorded the song for Utada Hikaru no Uta, a tribute album celebrating 15 years since Utada's debut.

Track listings and formats

Mini CD single
 "Automatic" – 5:14
 "Time Will Tell" – 5:30
 "Automatic" (Original karaoke) – 5:14

CD single
 "Automatic" – 5:14
 "Time Will Tell" – 5:30
 "Time Will Tell" (Dub mix) – 5:36

12" vinyl
 "Automatic" – 5:14
 "Time Will Tell" – 5:30
 "Time Will Tell" (Dub mix) – 5:36

Digital EP
 "Automatic" – 5:14
 "Time Will Tell" – 5:30
 "Time Will Tell" (Dub mix) – 5:36

Untitled 12" vinyl
 "Movin' on Without You" – 4:40
 "Movin' on Without You" (Tribal mix) – 4:40
 "Automatic" – 5:14
 "Time Will Tell" – 5:30
 "Time Will Tell" (Dub mix) – 5:36

Personnel
Credits adapted from the CD liner notes of First Love: 15th Anniversary edition.

Musicians and personnel

Hotoda Goh – mixing
Kei Kawano – additional arrangement
Masashi Kudo – recording
Tsuyoshi Kon – Guitar
Akira Miyake – production
Nobuhiko Nakayama – synthesizer programming
Akira Nishihira – arrangement, keyboards, programming
Taka & Speedy – rhythm tracks arrangement, programming
Masaaki Ugajin – recording
Hikaru Utada – writing, vocals
Teruzane "Skingg" Utada – production

Charts

Sales and certifications

Release history

Notes

References

External links
"Automatic" / "Time Will Tell" Mini CD single on Hikaru Utada's official website. 
"Automatic" / "Time Will Tell" CD single on Hikaru Utada's official website. 

1998 songs
1998 singles
EMI Music Japan singles
Hikaru Utada songs
Japanese-language songs
Songs written by Hikaru Utada
Torch songs